The Longjia (sometimes also known as the Nanjingren 南京人) are an unofficially recognized ethnic group of western Guizhou province, China. They are officially classified as Bai by the Chinese government.

History
Along with the neighboring Gelao, Miao, and Caijia peoples, the Longjia people had been a subjugated ethnic group under Nasu Yi control in Shuixi 水西 (modern-day Bijie Prefecture) during the Ming Dynasty. Nevertheless, the Longjia were given minor administrative posts since the Yi considered the Longjia to be the best educated among the subjugated ethnic groups, whereas the closely related Caijia people were often assigned to assist in horse stables due to their skills with horses (Herman 2007:74, 77). The Nasu Yi were not native to western Guizhou, but had migrated from the Luyang Mountains of northeastern Yunnan (in modern-day Huize, Xuanwei, and Dongchuan) during the 3rd century and founded the Mu'ege Kingdom around 300 C.E.

Names
In Zhijin County, the Longjia people (autonym: Songnibao 松尼保) are called Buwai 补外 by the Gelao, Siqie 斯切 (or Siye 斯业) by the Miao, and Awupu 阿武普 by the Yi (Zhijin County Gazetteer 1997:159). They are also called Guizou 归走 by the Caijia.

Guizhou (1984:8) lists the following exonyms for the Longjia people in IPA.
Yi exonym: 
Miao exonym: 
Caijia exonym: 
Gelao exonym: 

The Han Chinese call the Longjia by the following names (Zhijin County Gazetteer 1997).
Gou'er Longjia 狗耳龙家: Dading 大定 (present-day Dafang), Anshun, and Kangzuosi 康左司 of Guangshun 广顺州 (present-day Changshun)
Madeng Longjia 马镫龙家: in Dading 大定 (present-day Dafang), Zhenning
Datou Longjia 大头龙家: in Puding, Zhenning
Cengzhu Longjia 曾竹龙家: in Dafang
Xiaotou Longjia 小头龙家
Bai Longjia 白龙家

Language

The Longjia language is a Sino-Tibetan language.

Distribution
There is a total of 2,000–4,000 Longjia people in Pu'an, Pingba, and Qingzhen counties, Guizhou, as well as Longlin County of Guangxi. Within Bijie Prefecture, the Longjia are found in the counties of Bijie, Dafang, Zhijin, Qianxi, and Nayong. The Xixiu District Gazetteer 安顺市志：西秀区志 (2007:110) reports an ethnic Bai (Longjia) population of 1,458 households or 6,562 persons.

Reported locations include (Guizhou 1984:6):
Dafang County
Baibu River 白布河 area (both sides)
Wuxizhai, Xiaotun Township 小屯乡乌溪寨
Liuzhai, Xiangshui Township  响水乡六寨
Guomu, Lihua Township 理化乡果木
Yiduo, Guobao Township 果宝乡以朵
Qianxi County: Yuying 雨阴, Luhua 绿化, Longchang 龙场, Tianping 天坪, Huahuan 花缓, Huaxizhai 花溪寨
Zhijin County: Daga 大嘎, Sanjia 三甲
Nayong County: Jianxinhe 建新河, Yangchang 羊场, Dongguan 东关; Weixin 维新, Longchang 龙场, Zhikun 治昆
Anshun: Caiguan 蔡官, Huayan 华严, Erpu 二铺, Jiuzhou 旧州, Shuangbao  双堡 (in 35 natural villages, including Mutou 木头 and Taodui 讨兑 in the north; Ninggu 宁谷, Laotanghe 老塘河, Longga 陇嘎 in the central area; Xilong 西陇 and Zhemo Longtan 者模龙潭 in the east)
Puding County: Jiangyi 讲义, Huangmao 黄毛; Tianba 田坝 of Gumao 谷毛
Bijie: Shuanghua 双华, Songlin 松林, Zhenxi 镇西
Hezhang County: Wopicun 窝皮寸

Population figures are as follows.
Guizhou (total): 78,192
Dafang County: 24,790
Qianxi County: 13,268
Bijie: 12,847
Zhijin County: 4,859
Hezhang County: 7,352
Nayong County: 3,942
Qingzhen County: 3,135
Shuicheng County: 2,936
Anshun: 2,996
Puding County: 857
Weining County: 492
Pingba County: 439

The Duan clan 段氏 of Dafang County, the Shang clan 尚氏 of Nayong County, and the Yang clan 杨氏 of Pan County are officially classified as ethnic Bai, but belong to neither the Longjia nor Qixingmin groups (Guizhou Ethnic Gazetteer 2002:690).

Historical distribution
According to the Guizhou Ethnic Gazetteer (2002:689), the Dading Gazetteer (大定府志) gave the following townships with Longjia residents during the late Qing Dynasty.
Dafang County
Baina District 百纳区: Sheba 摄坝乡, Pengcheng 棚程乡
Jichang District 鸡场区: Zaigong 在拱乡
Lihua District 里化区: Lihua 里化镇, Xiaotun 小屯乡, Changchun 长春乡
Machang District 马场区: Guobao 果宝乡
Pojiao District 坡脚区: Changchong 长冲乡
Shuangshan District 双山区: Wenge 文阁乡, Maosu 毛粟乡
Xiangshui District 响水区: Dazhai 大寨乡, Baini 白泥乡, Dadao 大道乡, Xiangshui 响水镇
Daxi District 达溪区: Gaoshi 高视乡, Bazi 坝子乡
Piaojing District 飘井区: Shangba 上坝乡, Babao 八堡乡, Guobang 果帮乡
Changshi District 长石区: Zhangda 张大乡, Longli 隆里乡, Guowa 果瓦乡
Zhijin County
Babu District 八步区: Shagui 沙桂乡, Chadian 茶店乡
Yinajia District 以那架区: Guoyong 果永乡
Nayong County
Longchang District 龙场区: Yangchang 羊场乡, Yindi 阴底乡
Weixin District 维新区: Dongdi 董地乡, Dongguan 东关乡
Zhikun District 治昆区: Jianxinhe 建新河乡
Bijie
Zhuchang District 朱昌区: Mulai 木来乡, Shuanghua 双华乡
Yachi District 鸭池区: Baohe 保河乡
Jinsha County
Anle District 安乐区: Datian 大田乡

Dafang County
The Dafang County Gazetteer (1996:150-152) also reports Longjia people living in Dazhai 大寨 and Dadao 大道 of Dafang County, with more than 2,000 living in each. In Dafang County, villages that have between 1,000 - 2,000 Longjia people include Hegu 河谷, Bazi 坝子, Lihua 里/理化, Pengcheng 鹏程, Changshi 长石, Hetao 核桃, Guobao 果宝, Zhuchang 珠场, Xiangshuizhen 响水镇, Shangba 上坝, and Zeji 则鸡. Longjia with the autonym Songlibao 松立保 have also been reported in Jingzhu 荆竹村 and Bayi 八一村 villages in Babao Township 八堡乡, Dafang County.

Other locations are Cuoba 撮坝, Pengcheng 鹏程, Changchun 长春, Baini 白泥, Guowa 果瓦, Shangba 上坝, and Maopiao 毛票.

Bijie County
The Bijie County Gazetteer (1996:143) reports the following locations of ethnic Longjia.

Dazhai and Xiejiazhai of Shuanghua, Chahe Township 岔河镇双华大寨、谢家寨
Songlinzhai and Xiaohe of Lishu Township 梨树乡松林寨、小河
Dazhai, Zhenxi, Duipo Township 对坡镇镇西大寨
Caiguantun, Changchunbao Township 长春堡镇蔡官屯
Dazhai, Qingchang 青场大寨
Zhaojiazhai, Bazhai 八寨乡赵家寨
Datun, Yindi 阴底大屯

The Bijie County Gazetteer (1996:143) reports that the Bai people speak a language called Nanlong 南龙语.

Ethnic townships
The Chinese government has designated the following 15 townships in Guizhou as ethnic Bai townships (白族乡). Some have ethnic Longjia populations, while others have ethnic Caijia populations.

Shuicheng County 水城县
Longchang 龙场苗族白族彝族乡
Yingpan 营盘苗族彝族白族乡
Pan County 盘县
Jiuying 旧营白族彝族苗族乡
Yangchang 羊场布依族白族苗族乡
Bijie 毕节市
Yindi 阴底彝族苗族白族乡
Qianxi 千溪彝族苗族白族乡
Dafang County 大方县
Xiangshui 响水白族彝族仡佬族乡
Sanyuan 三元彝族苗族白族乡
Pudi 普底彝族苗族白族乡
Hetao 核桃彝族白族乡
Qianxi County 黔西县
Luhua 绿化白族彝族乡
Zhijin County 织金县
Sanjia 三甲白族苗族乡
Nayong County 纳雍县
Shedongguan 厍东关彝族苗族白族乡
Kunzhai 昆寨苗族彝族白族乡
Hezhang County 赫章县
Songlinpo 松林坡白族彝族苗族乡

See also
Qixingmin people
List of unrecognized ethnic groups of Guizhou

References

Tapp, Nicholas, Don Cohn, and Frances Wood. 2003. The tribal peoples of Southwest China: Chinese views of the other within. Bangkok: White Lotus Press. (See plates 5, 22, 32, and 47)
Zhao Weifeng [赵卫峰]. 2011. History of the Bai people of Guizhou [贵州白族史略]. Yinchuan, China: Ningxia People's Press [宁夏人民出版社]. 

Ethnic groups in China